The following is a discography of albums and singles released by the British pop rock band Liverpool Express (also known as L.E.X.).

Albums

Studio albums

Compilation albums

Other compilation albums

Extended plays

Demos

Singles

Soundtrack appearances

References

External links
 
 Official website

Liverpool Express